Ion Alexe (born 25 July 1946) is a retired heavyweight boxer from Romania. He competed at the 1968 and 1972 Olympics and won a silver medal in 1972, losing to Teófilo Stevenson by walkover after he was medically disqualified to contest the final. Alexe won the European title in 1969 and placed third in 1973. Domestically he won six Romanian heavyweight titles.

1972 Olympic results
Below are the results of Ion Alexe, a Romanian heavyweight boxer who competed at the 1972 Munich Olympics:

 Round of 16: defeated Jozsef Reder (Hungary) on points, 5-0
 Quarterfinal: defeated Jurgen Fanghanel (East Germany) on points, 5-0
 Semifinal: defeated Hasse Thomsen (Sweden) on points, 5-0
 Final: lost to Teofilo Stevenson (Cuba) by walkover (was awarded silver medal)

References

External links

1967 Romanian National Championships
1968 Romanian National Championships
1969 Romanian National Championships
1970 Romanian National Championships
1971 Romanian National Championships
1973 Romanian National Championships
1974 Romanian National Championships
1975 Romanian National Championships

Heavyweight boxers
Southpaw boxers
Boxers at the 1968 Summer Olympics
Boxers at the 1972 Summer Olympics
Olympic boxers of Romania
Olympic silver medalists for Romania
1946 births
Living people
People from Prahova County
Olympic medalists in boxing
Romanian male boxers
Medalists at the 1972 Summer Olympics